Småland Grenadier Corps, designated No. 7, was an infantry unit of the Swedish Army that was active in various forms from 1812 to 1901. The unit was based in Ränneslätt, about 2 km west of Eksjö.

History
Småland Grenadier Corps has its origins in the Småland Dragoon Regiment, which on 22 April 1812 was split into an infantry and a cavalry part. In 1816, all Swedish regiments received a designation, where Småland Grenadier Corps was awarded No. 7. The unit adopted the name Småland Dragoon Regiment's Infantry Battalion, and changed its namn in 1824 to Småland Grenadier Battalion. On 27 October 1888, the name Småland Grenadier Corps was adopted.

According to the 1901 Defense Reform, the corps was disbanded as an independent unit on 31 December 1901. Instead it came together with Blekinge Battalion to form Karlskrona Grenadier Regiment on 1 January 1902.

Units

Companies
The unit was allotted in western Småland, but trained at Ränneslätt at Eksjö. The unit's four companies constituted the four squadrons of 125 rusthåll (literally "arm household") each, which in 1812 were separated from the Småland Dragoon Regiment.

Barracks and training areas
Småland Grenadier Corps trained at Ränneslätt which is considered to be the Swedish military exercise site that has been in use for the longest time, from 1686 onwards.

Names, designations and locations

Footnotes

References

Notes

Print

Further reading

Infantry corps of the Swedish Army
Disbanded units and formations of Sweden
Military units and formations established in 1812
Military units and formations disestablished in 1901